Christian Elizabeth "Betty"/"Bett" Law (11 April 1928 – 19 May 2001) was a Scottish curler.

Teams

References

External links
 

1928 births
2001 deaths
People from Newburgh, Fife
Sportspeople from Fife
Scottish female curlers
European curling champions
Scottish curling champions